The 3rd European Women's Artistic Gymnastics Championships were held in Leipzig, East Germany, from June 3–4, 1961.

Medalists

Results

All-around

Vault

Uneven bars

Balance beam

Floor

References

1961
International gymnastics competitions hosted by Germany
International sports competitions hosted by East Germany
1961 in East German women's sport
Euro